"Never Again" is a song by Canadian rock band Nickelback. The song was released on July 8, 2002, as the third single from their third album, Silver Side Up (2001). It became a number one hit on the US Billboard Mainstream Rock Tracks chart, making it the band's third straight number one on this chart.

Content
The song is about domestic violence from a child's point of view. The song was not drawn from personal experience.

Music video
Nickelback originally had a music video made for the song, but the video was scrapped due to its violent nature. Instead, footage from Live at Home was shown as an alternative.

Track listings

European CD single
 "Never Again" (edit) – 3:41
 "One Last Run" (live) – 3:35

European enhanced CD single
 "Never Again" (single version) – 3:42
 "One Last Run" (live) – 3:35
 "Worthy to Say" (live) – 5:53
 "Never Again" (video)

European CD digipak single
 "Never Again" (full-length single version) – 4:22
 "Breathe" (live) – 4:05
 "Old Enough" (live) – 3:55

Charts

Certifications

Release history

References

2001 songs
2002 singles
Nickelback songs
Song recordings produced by Rick Parashar
Songs about domestic violence
Songs written by Chad Kroeger
Songs written by Mike Kroeger
Songs written by Ryan Peake